Mount Furlong is a summit in the U.S. state of Montana.

Mount Furlong was named after James Furlong, a trapper and afterward railroad employee.

References

Mountains of Flathead County, Montana
Furlong